The year 2016 is marked, in science fiction, by the following events.

Events 

 September 8: worldwide celebration of the 50th anniversary of Star Trek franchise.

Deaths 
 January 10 – David Bowie – English actor (The Man Who Fell to Earth, The Prestige) and rock singer who composed multiple science fiction-themed songs, including Space Oddity and the whole Ziggy Stardust album (born 1947)
 January 14 – Alan Rickman – British actor (Galaxy Quest, The Hitchhiker's Guide to the Galaxy) (born 1946)
 June 19 – Anton Yelchin – Russian-American actor, played Pavel Chekov in the Star Trek reboot film series (born 1989)
 July 26 – Jerry Doyle – American actor, known for his work as Michael Garibaldi in show Babylon 5 (born 1956)
 August 13 – Kenny Baker – English actor, known for playing R2-D2 in Star Wars (born 1934)
 September 25 – Robert Weinberg – Science fiction writer (born 1946)
 November 25 – Ron Glass – American actor (Firefly) (born 1945)
 December 24 – Richard Adams, British writer (born 1920)
 December 27 – Carrie Fisher – American actress, known for playing Princess Leia in Star Wars (born 1956)

Literary releases

Novels 
 Version Control, by Dexter Palmer
 Sleeping Giants, by Sylvain Neuvel
 The Everything Box, by Richard Kadrey
 Join, by Steve Toutonghi
 The Swarm by Orson Scott Card and Aaron Johnson
 Babylon's Ashes by James S.A. Corey
 Take Back the Sky by Greg Bear
 71 by David Brin
 2140 by Kim Stanley Robinson
 Raithe of the Boedecken by Matthew Stover
 Morning Star by Pierce Brown
 All the Birds in the Sky by Charlie Jane Anders

 Stories collections 

 Short stories 

 Comics 

 Movies 

Original/new franchise
 The 5th Wave, by J Blakeson
 24, by Vikram Kumar 
 Arrival, by Denis Villeneuve and Eric Heisserer
 Assassin's Creed, by Justin Kurzel
 Equals, by Drake Doremus
 The Girl with All the Gifts, by Colm McCarthy
 The Glass Fortress, by Alain Bourret
 Midnight Special, by Jeff Nichols
 Morgan, by Luke Scott
 Passengers, by Morten Tyldum

Sequels, spin-offs and remakes
 10 Cloverfield Lane, by Dan Trachtenberg
 The Divergent Series: Allegiant, by Robert Schwentke
 Independence Day: Resurgence, by Roland Emmerich
 Rogue One: A Star Wars Story, by Gareth Edwards
 Star Trek Beyond, by Justin Lin

 Television 
 11.22.63, by Bridget Carpenter
 12 Monkeys, season 2, by Terry Matalas and Travis Fickett
 3%, by Pedro Aguilera
 Adventure Time, season 8, by Pendleton Ward
 Colony, by Carlton Cuse and Ryan J. Condal
 Daredevil, season 2, by Drew Goddard
 The Expanse by Mark Fergus, Hawk Ostby
 Future-Worm!, by Ryan Quincy
 Home: Adventures with Tip & Oh, by Ryan Crego and Thurop Van Orman
 The Last Ship, season 3, by William Brinkley
 Macross Delta Miles from Tomorrowland, season 2, by Sascha Paladino
 The OA, by Brit Marling and Zal Batmanglij
 Sonic Boom, season 2
 Star Wars Rebels, season 2, by Simon Kinberg, Dave Filoni, Carrie Beck
 Steven Universe, seasons 3+4, by Rebecca Sugar
 Stranger Things, by The Duffer Brothers
 Timeless, by Eric Kripke and Shawn Ryan
 Travelers, by Brad Wright
  Trepalium, by Antarès Bassis, Sophie Hiet and  Vincent Lannoo
 Westworld, by Jonathan Nolan
 The X-Files (season 10), by Chris Carter

 Video games 
 Stellaris, a 4X Strategy game by Paradox
 No Man's Sky, by Hello Games
 The Technomancer, by Spiders (company)
 Destiny: Rise of Iron, by Bungie
 Overwatch, by Blizzard Entertainment
 Deus Ex: Mankind Divided, by Eidos Montréal

 Awards 
 Hugo Award 

Best novel: N. K. Jemisin The Fifth Season''
Best dramatic presentation (long form) – The Martian

Nebula Award

Locus Award 

Best Science Fiction Novel: Ancillary Mercy by Ann Leckie

Saturn Award 

Best science fiction film: Star Wars: The Force Awakens
Best Science Fiction Television Series: Continuum

Grand Prix de l'Imaginaire Award

Prix Rosny-Aîné Award

BSFA Award

Sidewise Award for Alternate History

Arthur C. Clarke Award

Edward E. Smith Memorial Award

Kurd-Laßwitz-Preis

Seiun Award

Academy Award
 Mad Max: Fury Road: 6 Oscars for Best Film Editing, Best Sound Editing, Best Sound Mixing, Best Production Design, Best Costume Design, Best Makeup and Hairstyling.
 Ex Machina for best visual effects

See also 
 2016 in science

References

Science fiction by year

science-fiction